A five-star rank is the highest military rank in many countries. The rank is that of the most senior operational military commanders, and within NATO's standard rank scale it is designated by the code OF-10. Not all armed forces have such a rank, and in those that do the actual insignia of the five-star ranks may not contain five stars. For example: the insignia for the French OF-10 rank  contains seven stars; the insignia for the Portuguese  contains four gold stars. The stars used on the rank insignias of various Commonwealth of Nations are sometimes referred to colloquially as pips, but are stars of the orders of the Garter, Thistle or Bath or Eversleigh stars depending on the wearer's original regiment or corps, and are used in combination with other heraldic items, such as batons, crowns, swords or maple leaves.

Typically, five-star officers hold the rank of general of the army, admiral of the fleet, field marshal, marshal or general of the air force, and several other similarly named ranks. As an active rank, the position exists only in a minority of countries and is usually held by only a very few officers during wartime. In times of peace, it is usually held only as an honorary rank. Traditionally, five-star ranks are granted to distinguished military commanders for notable wartime victories and/or in recognition of a record of achievement during the officer's career, whether in peace or in war. Alternatively, a five-star rank (or even higher ranks) may be assumed by heads of state in their capacities as commanders-in-chief of their nation's armed forces.

Despite the rarity and seniority of five-star officers, an even more-senior rank of general of the armies was adopted in the United States.

Australia
Admiral of the fleet
Field marshal
Marshal of the Royal Australian Air Force
Only one Australian-born officer, Field Marshal Sir Thomas Blamey, has held a substantive Australian five-star rank. Lord Birdwood, who commanded the Australian Imperial Force in the First World War, was appointed to honorary five-star rank in the Australian Military Forces on his promotion to field marshal in the British Army in 1925. King George VI and Prince Philip, Duke of Edinburgh, have held all three Australian five-star ranks in an honorary capacity, and have been the only holders of the Australian ranks of admiral of the fleet and marshal of the RAAF.

Brazil 
Five-star ranks in Brazil are only used in wartime.

 Marshal (Brazil)
 Grand admiral
 Marshal of the air

Cambodia
General of the army, Royal Cambodian Armed Forces

Croatia
 (lit. "staff general", usually translated as general of the army) awarded to six men, none of whom are in active duty.
 (admiral of the fleet). The rank was called  (lit. "staff admiral") until 1999; only Sveto Letica was awarded this rank—in March 1996, three months before his retirement.

Germany

German Empire

Nazi Germany 

 Generalfeldmarschall in the Heer equivalent in the English-speaking world general of the army 

 Generalfeldmarschall in the Luftwaffe equivalent in the English-speaking world marshal of the air force 

 Großadmiral in the Kriegsmarine equivalent in the English-speaking world admiral of the fleet

 Reichsführer-SS in the Schutzstaffel (SS) equivalent in the English-speaking world captain of the guard

It is also worth noting that this was not the apex and there was a six-star rank also present in the Wehrmacht known as Reichsmarschall, however it was only ever present in the Luftwaffe and only ever held by one man: Hermann Göring, arguably the second most powerful man in Nazi Germany.

India
Field marshal, held by two officers
Marshal of the Indian Air Force, held by one officer
Admiral of the fleet, never been held

General Sam Manekshaw was the first officer to be promoted to five-star rank. He was promoted to the rank of field marshal on 1 January 1973 after the Indo-Pakistani War of 1971. General K. M. Cariappa, the first Indian commander-in-chief of the Indian Army was promoted to the rank of field marshal in 1986. In 2001, Air Chief Marshal Arjan Singh was promoted to the rank of marshal of the Indian Air Force (MIAF). Around 1998, the Indian Air Force introduced gorget patches (or collar tabs) for its air officers. The MIAF's patches display five stars.

Indonesia
According to Government Regulation No. 32/1997, the Indonesian five-star ranks are:
 (grand general) – only awarded to three people: 
Soedirman, the rank was granted posthumously.
Abdul Haris Nasution, the rank was granted 26-years after his retirement.
Soeharto (second president of Indonesia), his rank was granted during his own rule.
 (grand admiral) – never awarded
 (grand marshal) – never awarded

The five-star ranks above are honorary rank and does not provide additional authority or responsibility.

However, Government Regulation No. 32/1997 has been revoked and replaced by Government Regulation No. 39/2010, and the latest regulation does not mention a five-star rank. Therefore, it is unlikely that there will be any Indonesian military personnel awarded five-star rank in the future.

Italy

These ranks are used by the Italian chief of the general staff only.

Myanmar

Senior general is the highest rank in Myanmar Armed Forces. It is the single rank for all three branches, and held by the commander-in-chief of Defence Services (CinCDS). It was created during the expansion of Armed Forces structure in 1990, and the first person to hold is Saw Maung promoted by himself directly from general to senior general on 18 March 1990.

Netherlands

Admiral is theoretically the highest possible military rank in the Royal Netherlands Navy, although this five-star rank is no longer awarded.

Pakistan
Field marshal, held by Ayub Khan
Marshal of the air force, never been held
Admiral of the fleet, never been held

Philippines
Under Article VII, Section 18 of the constitution, the president holds the position of commander-in-chief, which is not considered and recognized to be a five-star rank.

Historically, five-star ranks were held by field marshals. US Army General Douglas MacArthur was the first and only field marshal in the history of the Philippine Army, a position he held while also acting as the military advisor to the commonwealth government of the Philippines with a rank of major general. President Quezon conferred the rank of field marshal on 24 August 1936 and MacArthur's duty included the supervision of the creation of the Philippines nation-state.

Poland
Marshal of Poland is a Polish Army five-star rank. There are today no living marshals of Poland, since this rank is bestowed only on military commanders who have achieved victory in war. The last appointment was in 1963 to Marian Spychalski.

Portugal
Different from most other countries, the marshals (Army and Air Force) and admirals of the fleet (Navy) of Portugal are not identified by five stars, but by four golden stars, in comparison with generals and admirals who are also identified by four stars, but in silver.

Five-star appointments—and not ranks—were however foreseen in the armed forces of Portugal, at different times in the past, for the officers exercising the several government posts related with defense (minister of national defense, minister for the army, secretary of state for the army, etc.).

Romania
 (marshal of the Romanian Army) is the highest military rank in the Romanian military forces. This rank can be bestowed to persons from the royal family or to four-star generals or admirals during wartime only. After World War II, the latest surviving marshal of Romania was King Michael I, who was bestowed this rank on May 10, 1941 (the national day of Romania). He died in December 2017.

South Vietnam
 General of the army, Army-held by one officer
 Admiral of the fleet, Navy
 General of the air force, Air Force
Five-star ranks were used by the former Republic of Vietnam Military Forces during the Vietnam War, from 1955 to 1975. The ranks were changed in 1964 to resemble US ranks more closely. The rank only bestowed to Lê Văn Tỵ

Spain
Captain general (Army)
Captain general of the Navy
Air captain general (Air Force)

Since 1922 it is not properly a rank but a "military dignity". The only full capitán general is currently His Majesty the King of Spain, the last not-royal appointment (honorary) was in 1994 to Manuel Gutiérrez Mellado. The rank of capitán general is currently bestowed also to several images of the Virgin Mary, among them la Virgen de Butarque, la Virgen del Pilar, la Virgen de Guadalupe, Nuestra Señora de los Reyes, la Virgen de los Desamparados (this one properly capitana generalísima), la Virgen de la Serra, la Virgen del Canto y la Virgen de los Remedios. The latest appointment was to Nuestra Señora de los Dolores, April 2011.

Sri Lanka

Field marshal (Sri Lanka Army five-star rank)
Admiral of the fleet (Sri Lanka Navy five-star rank)
Marshal of the Sri Lanka Air Force (Sri Lanka Air Force five-star rank)

Thailand
, Royal Thai Army
, Royal Thai Navy
, Royal Thai Air Force

The monarch of Thailand is appointed to the three ranks automatically upon accession as he is the constitutional head of the Royal Thai Armed Forces. Since 1973 the three ranks have been reserved for members of the royal family.

United Kingdom
The worn insignia of British five-star commanders do not contain stars; the vehicle star plate, mounted on the front of a staff car, does display five stars.
Admiral of the fleet (awarded to 121 men to date)
Field marshal (awarded to 140 men to date)
Marshal of the Royal Air Force (awarded to 27 men to date)

Promotion to the ranks of admiral of the fleet and marshal of the Royal Air Force is now generally held in abeyance in peacetime with exceptions for special circumstances. Promotion to the rank of field marshal was generally stopped in 1995 as a cost-cutting measure but is still made in some cases. The most recent appointments to five-star ranks are the promotions in 2012 of the Prince of Wales to honorary five-star rank in all three services, and of former Chief of the Defence Staff Lord Guthrie of Craigiebank to the honorary rank of field marshal. In 2014 the former Chief of the Defence Staff Lord Stirrup was promoted to the honorary rank of marshal of the Royal Air Force.

During World War II and after, serving NATO, a small number of British five-star commanders have held the additional title Supreme Allied Commander, given operational control over all air, land, and sea units led by the four-star commanders of multi-national forces.

United States
Fleet admiral (held by four officers)
General of the Army (held by five officers)
General of the Air Force (held by one officer)

Before the five-star ranks were established in 1944, two officers had previously been promoted from their four-star ranks to the superior and unique ranks of Admiral of the Navy and General of the Armies: Admiral George Dewey (appointment 1903 retroactive to 1899, died 1917) and General John J. Pershing (appointed 1919, died 1948). In 1944 the Navy and Army specified that these officers were considered senior to any officers promoted to the five-star ranks within their services (but it was not clear if they were senior by rank or by seniority due to an earlier date of rank).

Five-star ranks were created in the U.S. military during World War II because of the awkward situation created when some American senior commanders were placed in positions commanding allied officers of higher rank. U.S. officers holding five-star rank draw full active duty pay for life, both before and after retiring from active duty. The five-star ranks were retired in 1981 on the death of General of the Army Omar Bradley.

Nine Americans have been promoted to five-star rank, one of them, Henry H. Arnold, in two services (U.S. Army then later in the U.S. Air Force). As part of the bicentennial celebration, George Washington was, 177 years after his death, permanently made senior to all other U.S. generals and admirals with the title General of the Armies effective on 4 July 1976. The appointment stated he was to have "rank and precedence over all other grades of the Army, past or present".

During World War II and (later) serving NATO, a small number of American five-star commanders have also held the additional title of Supreme Allied Commander, given operational control over all air, land, and sea units led by the four-star commanders of multi-national forces.

Law enforcement usage
In various law enforcement agencies, such as the Detroit Police Department and Los Angeles County Sheriff's Department, their respective heads wear five-star ranks.

See also
Ranks and insignia of NATO
List of fleet and grand admirals
List of field marshals
List of marshals of the Air Force
Design of US army insignia
Heraldic origin of the use of five-pointed star
Six-star rank
Four-star rank

Notes

References 

Military ranks